José Manuel Carrasco Correa (born 27 January 1988) is a Spanish footballer who plays for Linares Deportivo as a central defender.

External links

1988 births
Living people
People from Antequera
Sportspeople from the Province of Málaga
Spanish footballers
Footballers from Andalusia
Association football defenders
Segunda División players
Segunda División B players
Tercera División players
Villarreal CF B players
Benidorm CF footballers
Écija Balompié players
Real Murcia Imperial players
Real Murcia players
Mérida AD players
CF Fuenlabrada footballers
Ontinyent CF players
Johor Darul Ta'zim II F.C. players
Spanish expatriate footballers
Spanish expatriate sportspeople in Thailand
Spanish expatriate sportspeople in Georgia (country)
Expatriate footballers in Thailand
Expatriate footballers in Georgia (country)
Spanish expatriate sportspeople in India
UD Fuengirola Los Boliches players